Events from the year 1984 in the United States.

Incumbents

Federal government 
 President: Ronald Reagan (R-California)
 Vice President: George H. W. Bush (R-Texas)
 Chief Justice: Warren E. Burger (Minnesota)
 Speaker of the House of Representatives: Tip O'Neill (D-Massachusetts)
 Senate Majority Leader: Howard Baker (R-Tennessee)
 Congress: 98th

Events

January 
January 1 – US Bell System is broken up.
January 3 – U.S. President Ronald Reagan meets with Navy Lieutenant Robert Goodman and the Reverend Jesse Jackson at the White House, following Lieutenant Goodman's release from Syrian captivity.
January 10 – The United States and the Vatican re-establish full diplomatic relations.
January 25 – President Ronald Reagan announces in his State of the Union Address that the United States will begin development of a permanently crewed space station and invite international space agencies to the project – a concept initially known as Space Station Freedom, later evolved into the International Space Station.
January 27 – Michael Jackson's hair catches on fire during the filming of a Pepsi commercial.

February 
 February 3 – Dr. John Buster and the research team at Harbor-UCLA Medical Center announce history's first embryo transfer, from one woman to another resulting in a live birth.
 February 3 – STS-41-B: Space Shuttle Challenger is launched on the 10th Space Shuttle mission.
 February 11 – STS-41-B: Space Shuttle Challenger makes the first shuttle landing at the Kennedy Space Center.
 February 13 – Theta Kappa Pi sorority is founded at Penn State University.
 February 16 – Bill Johnson becomes first American male to win an Olympic gold medal in alpine skiing.
 February 24 – Tyrone Mitchell kills two people at 49th Street Elementary School in South Central Los Angeles, California.
 February 26 – United States Marines pull out of Beirut, Lebanon.
 February 28 – Michael Jackson wins a record eight Grammy Awards.

March
 March 16 
 The CIA station chief in Beirut, William Francis Buckley, is kidnapped by Islamic Jihad and later dies in captivity.
 Gary Plauché fatally shoots his son Jody's sexual abuser, Jeff Doucet, at Baton Rouge Metropolitan Airport in Louisiana.
 March 22 – Teachers at the McMartin Preschool in Manhattan Beach, California are charged with Satanic ritual abuse of the schoolchildren (the charges are later dropped as completely unfounded).

April
 April 4 – U.S. President Ronald Reagan calls for an international ban on chemical weapons.
 April 9 – The 56th Academy Awards, hosted by Johnny Carson, are held at the Dorothy Chandler Pavilion in Los Angeles, with James L. Brooks' Terms of Endearment winning Best Picture and Best Director, as well as three other awards out of 11 nominations. 
 April 23 – Margaret Heckler of the U.S. Public Health Service announces the identity of HTLV-III as the virus that causes AIDS.
 April 24 – The 6.2  Morgan Hill earthquake shook central California and the South Bay area with a maximum Mercalli intensity of VIII (Severe), causing 21–27 injuries and $7.5–8 million in losses.

May
May 8
 1984 Summer Olympics boycott: The Soviet Union announces that it will boycott the 1984 Summer Olympics in Los Angeles, California.
 Forces veteran Denis Lortie shoots and kills three government employees in the National Assembly of Quebec building in Quebec City. The National Assembly's sergeant-at-arms, René Jalbert, talks Lortie into surrendering.
 The longest game in Major League Baseball history begins at 7:30 PM between the Milwaukee Brewers and the Chicago White Sox. The game is played over the course of 2 days, lasting 25 innings, with a total time of 8 hours and 6 minutes.
 May 12 – The 1984 Louisiana World Exposition, a World's fair, opens in New Orleans.
 May 17 – Michael Silka kills nine people near Manley Hot Springs, Alaska.
 May 19 – The Edmonton Oilers defeat the New York Islanders to win their first Stanley Cup.
 May 27 – An overnight flash flood rages through neighborhoods in Tulsa, Oklahoma. Nearly 15 inches of rain falls in some areas over a four-hour period. Fourteen people are killed.
 May 31 – Six death row inmates at Mecklenburg Correctional Center in Mecklenburg County, Virginia, including James and Linwood Briley, escape, the only occasion this has ever happened in the US. All are eventually recaptured and executed.

June
 June 1 – William M. Gibbons is released as receiver and trustee of the Chicago, Rock Island and Pacific Railroad, after all of its debts and creditors are paid off by order of a federal bankruptcy court.
 June 3 – Ronald Reagan visits his ancestral home in Ballyporeen, the Republic of Ireland.
 June 4 – Bruce Springsteen releases his 7th album Born in the U.S.A.. The CD of the album is the first CD to be manufactured in the U.S.
 June 8
 1984 Barneveld, Wisconsin tornado outbreak: An F5 tornado nearly destroys the town of Barneveld, Wisconsin, killing nine people, injuring nearly 200, and causing over $25,000,000 in damage.
 Ghostbusters and Gremlins are released.
 June 16 – Ricky Kasso murders Gary Lauwers in Northport, Long Island, New York.
 June 22 – The Karate Kid is released.
 June 25 – Purple Rain, the sixth studio album by recording artist Prince, is released by Warner Bros. Records. The soundtrack to the film of the same name, it is the first album where his band The Revolution is billed.
 June 28 – Richard Ramírez (the "Night Stalker") murders his first confirmed victim.

July
 July 13 – Terry Wallis, a 19-year-old living in the Ozark Mountains of Arkansas, falls into a deep coma after a severe automobile accident; he will eventually awaken 19 years later on June 13, 2003.
 July 18
 Beverly Burns becomes the first female Boeing 747 captain in the world.
 In San Ysidro, California, 41-year-old James Oliver Huberty sprays a McDonald's restaurant with gunfire, killing 21 people before being shot and killed.
 July 23 – Vanessa L. Williams becomes the first Miss America to resign, when she surrenders her crown after nude photos of her appear in Penthouse magazine.
 July 27 – Metallica releases a second studio album, Ride the Lightning.
 July 28–August 12 – The 1984 Summer Olympics are held in Los Angeles, California.

August
[[File:STS-41-D launch August 30, 1984.jpg|thumb|x200px|right|August 30–September 5: [[Space Shuttle Discovery|Space Shuttle Discovery'''s]] maiden voyage]]
 August 11 – United States President Ronald Reagan, during a voice check for a radio broadcast remarks, "My fellow Americans, I'm pleased to tell you today that I've signed legislation that will outlaw Russia forever. We begin bombing in five minutes."
 August 30 – STS-41-D: The Space Shuttle Discovery takes off on its maiden voyage.

September
 September 5 – STS-41-D: The Space Shuttle Discovery lands after its maiden voyage.
 September 17 – The Transformers debuts in syndication.
 September 10 – Jeopardy! begins its syndicated version, with host Alex Trebek.
 September 20 – Hezbollah car-bombs the U.S. Embassy annex in Beirut, killing 24 people.

October
 October 1 – American Movie Classics is initiated.
 October 2 – John Schnatter opens the first Papa John's Pizza in Jeffersonville, Indiana.
 October 5 – STS-41-G: Marc Garneau becomes the first Canadian in space, aboard the Space Shuttle Challenger.
 October 6 – Out of Control debuts on Nickelodeon.
 October 7 – Barbara Walters hosts the first presidential debate between Walter Mondale and President Reagan in Kentucky.
 October 11
 Aboard the Space Shuttle Challenger, astronaut Kathryn D. Sullivan becomes the first American woman to perform a space walk.
 Geraldine Ferraro and George H. W. Bush participate in the 1984 vice presidential debate.
 October 14 – World Series: The Detroit Tigers defeat the San Diego Padres to win in 5 games.
 October 21 – The final presidential debate of the 1984 election takes place in Kansas.

November

 November – The unemployment rate drops to 7.2%, the same rate it was when the early 1980s recession started in June 1981.
 November 2 – Capital punishment: Velma Barfield becomes the first woman executed in the United States since 1962, in Raleigh, North Carolina.
 November 6 – 1984 United States presidential election: Ronald Reagan defeats Walter F. Mondale with 59% of the popular vote, the highest since Richard Nixon's 61% victory in 1972. Reagan carries 49 states in the electoral college; Mondale wins only his home state of Minnesota by a mere 3,761 vote margin and the District of Columbia.
 November 9 – Cesar Chavez delivers his speech, "What The Future Holds For Farm Workers And Hispanics", at the Commonwealth Club in San Francisco.
 November 28 – Over 250 years after their deaths, William Penn and his wife Hannah Callowhill Penn are made Honorary Citizens of the United States.

December
 December 1 – Controlled Impact Demonstration: NASA intentionally crashes a remote controlled Boeing 720.
 December 8 – White supremacist and Order leader Robert Jay Mathews is killed in a gun battle and fire during an FBI siege on Whidbey Island.
 December 22 – Four African-American youths (Barry Allen, Troy Canty, James Ramseur, and Darrell Cabey) board an express train in The Bronx borough of New York City. They attempt to rob Bernhard Goetz, who shoots them. The event starts a national debate about urban crime, which is a plague in 1980s America.

Undated
 Arlene Violet, until recently a religious sister, becomes Attorney General of Rhode Island, the first female Attorney General elected in the U.S.
 Ryan White, a student who contracted AIDS, is expelled from Western High School in Russiaville, Indiana because of his disease.
 Crack cocaine, a smokeable form of the drug, becomes widely used in the Los Angeles area and soon spreads across the United States in what becomes known as the Crack epidemic.
 Linsalata Capital Partners, a private equity firm is founded in Ohio.
 Soul In Motion Players performing arts organization is founded in Maryland.

Ongoing
 Cold War (1947–1991)

Births
January

 January 1 – Lance Brooks, Olympic discus thrower
 January 3
 Carlina Rivera, politician
 Shelby Starner, singer/songwriter (d. 2003)
 January 4
 Derek Brunson, mixed martial artist
 Raphael Butler, boxer and mixed martial artist
 Robin Sydney, actress
 January 5 – Josh Alcala, soccer player
 January 6
 Hilaria Baldwin, yoga instructor, entrepreneur, podcaster, and author
 Jimmy Barthmaier, baseball player
 D.J. Bettencourt, politician
 A.J. Hawk, football player and sports analyst
 Kate McKinnon, actress and comedian
 Eric Trump, businessman, philanthropist and reality TV personality, son of Donald Trump
 January 7
 Chris Ayer, singer/songwriter and guitarist
 Caros Fodor, mixed martial artist, brother of Phoenix Jones
 Jon Lester, baseball player
 Mallory Snyder, model and television personality
 January 8 – Jeff Francoeur, baseball player
 January 9
 Jesse Broadwater, archer
 Drew Brown, musician and songwriter
 January 11
 Eddie Alvarez, mixed martial artist
 Pennjamin Bannekar, music artist and songwriter
 Melissa Ben-Ishay, founder and creator of Baked by Melissa
 Kevin Boss, football player
 Bradley Buckman, basketball player
 January 12
 Tyler Blanski, Roman Catholic author, musician, and record producer
 Scott Olsen, baseball player
 January 13 
 Nathaniel Motte, singer-songwriter, performer, music producer, film composer, instrumentalist and playwright
 Adam Zimmer, American football coach (d. 2022)
 January 14 – Shagari Alleyne, basketball player
 January 15
 Megan Quann, Olympic swimmer
 Victor Rasuk, actor
 Ben Shapiro, political commentator and writer
 January 17
 Rickey D'Shon Collins, actor
 Cassie Hager, basketball player
 January 18
 Seung-Hui Cho, Korean-born Virginia Tech massacre gunman (d. 2007)
 Kristy Lee Cook, singer
 Benji Schwimmer, dancer
 January 19
 Nate Bennett, football player
 Lil Scrappy, rapper
 January 21
 Luke Grimes, actor
 Amy Hastings, athlete
 Haloti Ngata, soccer player
 January 24
 Nia Abdallah, Olympic Taekwondo practitioner
 Justin Baldoni, actor, director, and filmmaker
 Danny Baugher, football player
 Ashley C. Williams, actress 
 January 25
 Jay Briscoe, wrestler (d. 2023)
 Kaiji Tang, voice actor
 January 26
 Prince Bagdasarian, director, screenwriter, and editor
 Kelli Barrett, actress
 January 27 – Davetta Sherwood, actress and musician 
 January 28
 Stephen Gostkowski, football player
 Andre Iguodala, basketball player
 January 29 – Jameson Bostic, American-born New Zealand boxer
 January 30
 Arthur Chu, columnist and Jeopardy! contestant
 Kid Cudi, actor, rapper, record producer, and singer/songwriter
 January 31 – Paul Baccaglini, entrepreneur and investor

February

 February 1
 Casey Ashley, bass fisherman
 Abbi Jacobson, comedian, writer and actress
 Lee Thompson Young, actor (d. 2013) 
 February 2 – David Pakman, political pundit  
 February 3 
 Elizabeth Holmes, convicted fraudster, founder of Theranos
 Matthew Moy, actor 
 Phillipe Nover, mixed martial artist
 February 5
 Jonny Kim, Navy SEAL, physician, and astronaut
 Nate Salley, football player
 February 6
 Dek Bake, football player
 Mike Ballard, baseball player
 Zered Bassett, skateboarder
 February 7 – Dominique Byrd, football player
 February 8
 Kevin Ara, soccer player
 Cecily Strong, actress and comedian
 February 9
 Maurice Ager, basketball player
 Logan Bartholomew, actor
 Kourtney Brown, Bahamian-born actor, host, model, and visual artist
 February 10
 Kayla Ard, basketball coach
 Courtney Brown, football player
 February 11
 Sril Art, visual artist, muralist, and entrepreneur
 Matt Good, singer and guitarist for From First to Last
 Aubrey O'Day, singer and actress
 February 12 
 Tony Ferguson, mixed martial artist
 Brad Keselowski, stock car driver
 Peter Vanderkaay, Olympic swimmer
 February 13
 LaToya Bond, basketball player
 Matt Buschmann, baseball player
 Brina Palencia, voice actress
 February 14
 Janeshia Adams-Ginyard, actress, stunt woman, and wrestler
 Matt Barr, actor
 February 15
 Mitchell Boggs, baseball player
 Matt and Ross Duffer, twin screenwriters and directors
 February 16 – Brent Bookwalter, cyclist
 February 17
 Calvin Bannister, football player
 Jimmy Jacobs, wrestler
 Drew Miller, ice hockey player
 February 18
 Brian Bogusevic, baseball player
 Darrick Brown, football player
 Buddy Nielsen, frontman for Senses Fail
 Chris Richardson, contestant on American Idol (season 6)
 February 19 – Marissa Meyer, novelist
 February 20 – Ben Lovejoy, ice hockey player
 February 22
 Kristen Soltis Anderson, political pollster and television personality
 Juanita Brent, politician
 February 23 – Andy Bronkema, basketball coach
 February 24
 Wilson Bethel, actor
 Liz Bogus, soccer player
 February 27 – James Augustine, basketball player
 February 28
 Quincy Black, football player
 Sanders Bohlke, singer/songwriter
 February 29
 Mark Foster, singer and composer, frontman of Foster the People
 Alicia Hollowell, softball player
 Cullen Jones, Olympic swimmer

March

 March 1 – Brandon Stanton, photographer and blogger
 March 2
 Chris Algieri, boxer and kickboxer
 Blake Anderson, actor, comedian, producer, screenwriter, and fashion designer
 John Bernecker, stunt performer (d. 2017)
 Trent Garrett, actor and model
 Ian Sinclair, voice actor
 March 3
 Curtis Brown, football player
 Mike Gallagher, politician
 Santonio Holmes, football player
 March 4 – Zak Whitbread, soccer player
 March 5 – Aarthi Agarwal, actress
 March 6
 Prescott Burgess, football player
 Chris Tomson, musician, drummer for Vampire Weekend
 March 7
 Steve Burtt Jr., American-born Ukrainian basketball player
 Brandon T. Jackson, stand-up comedian, actor and rapper
 March 8
 Fernanda Andrade, Brazilian-born actress and model
 Jon Burklo, soccer coach
 March 9
 Priscilla Ahn, singer/songwriter and multi-instrumentalist
 Kris Budden, sports reporter
 Julia Mancuso, Olympic skier
 March 10
 Aaron Bates, baseball player
 Olivia Wilde, actress and model
 March 11
 Rob Brown, actor
 Eric Calderone, guitarist and YouTuber
 March 12 – Jaimie Alexander, actress
 March 13
 Landon Ashworth, actor, producer, and writer
 Rachael Bella, actress
 March 14
 Aric Almirola, Cuban-born stock car racing driver
 Ambrosia Anderson, basketball player
 Randor Bierd, baseball player
 Travis Brody, football player
 Ahmad Brooks, football player
 Dan Crenshaw, politician and Navy SEAL
 March 16
 Robby Bostain, American-born Israeli basketball player
 Levi Brown, football player
 Salim Bullen, soccer player
 Alejandro Edda, Mexican-born actor
 March 17
 Ryan Beaver, country singer/songwriter
 Ryan Rottman, actor
 March 18
 Molly Gray, politician, 83rd Lieutenant Governor of Vermont
 Vonzell Solomon, singer
 March 20
 Justine Ezarik, Internet celebrity and actress
 Christy Carlson Romano, actress and singer
 Marcus Vick, football player
 March 21 – Megan Alderete, racing cyclist
 March 22 – La'Tangela Atkinson, basketball player
 March 23 – McKinley Belcher III, actor
 March 24 – Chris Bosh, basketball player
 March 25 – Katharine McPhee, singer-songwriter and actress
 March 26
 Eric Bellinger, singer/songwriter and producer
 Sara Jean Underwood, model
 Brady Walkinshaw, politician
 March 27
 Stefano Barberi, Brazilian-born cyclist
 Stephen Rhodes, stock car driver 
 Jon Paul Steuer, actor and musician (d. 2018)
 March 28
 Stephen Amritraj, tennis player
 Arliss Beach, football player
 Sarah Benck, singer/songwriter
 Stephen Bowen, football player
 Bill Switzer, Canadian-born voice actor
 March 29
 Nate Adams, motocross rider
 Nikki Blue, basketball player and coach
 March 30
 Justin Moore, country singer
 Anna Nalick, singer
 March 31 – Jack Antonoff, indie pop musician

April

 April 1 – Johnny Baldwin, football player
 April 2
 Mariana Atencio, television host, author, and motivational speaker
 Thomas Payne, U.S. Army Delta Force Veteran and Medal of Honor Recipient
 Ashley Peldon, actress  
 April 3 – Chrissie Fit, actress and singer
 April 4
 Brian Bell, football player
 Sean May, basketball player 
 April 5
 Marshall Allman, actor
 Danny Baranowsky, electronic music composer
 Phil Wickham, musician
 April 6 – Max Bemis, singer and frontman for Say Anything
 April 8
 Matt Bassuener, football player
 Ezra Koenig, musician
 Brandon Scott, politician, mayor of Baltimore, Maryland
 Taran Noah Smith, actor 
 Kirsten Storms, actress  
 April 10
 Jeremy Barrett, pair skater
 Natasha Melnick, actress
 Mandy Moore, singer-songwriter, actress and fashion designer
 April 11 
 Colin Clark, soccer player (d. 2019) 
 Kelli Garner, actress
 April 12
 Michael Arceneaux, writer
 brentalfloss, singer/songwriter, composer, and lyricist
 April 13 – Josh Abercrombie, wrestler
 April 14
 Raumesh Akbari, politician
 Richard Boswell, stock car racing driver
 Adán Sánchez, singer (d. 2004)
 April 16
 Amelia Atwater-Rhodes, author
 Teddy Blass, composer and record producer
 Noah Fleiss, actor
 April 18 
 Red Bryant, football player
 America Ferrera, actress
 April 20
 Sophia Amoruso, businesswoman and founder of Nasty Gal
 Garrett Bischoff, referee and wrestler, son of Eric Bischoff
 Anthony Fasano, football player
 Tyson Griffin, mixed martial artist
 Rob Kersey, singer and frontman for Psychostick
 Harris Wittels, actor, producer and screenwriter (d. 2015)
 April 21 – Shayna Fox, voice actress
 April 22
 Danielle Bounds, beauty pageant contestant
 Whitny Braun, bioethicist, professor, investigative researcher, documentary filmmaker, and podcaster
 April 23 – Jesse Lee Soffer, actor
 April 24
 Alan Belcher, mixed martial artist
 Stephen L. Brusatte, paleontologist and evolutionary biologist
 Tyson Ritter, singer, bassist and frontman for The All-American Rejects
 April 25
 Robert Andino, Cuban-born baseball player
 Jillian Bell, comedian, actress, and screenwriter
 LaRue Burley, mixed martial artist
 Derrick Byars, basketball player and entrepreneur
 Melonie Diaz, actress
 April 26
 Kimberly Brandão, American-born Portuguese footballer
 Carlos Condit, mixed martial artist
 Ryan O'Donohue, voice actor
 Emily Wickersham, actress
 April 27
 Milton Blanco, soccer player
 Adam Botana, politician
 Patrick Stump, singer-songwriter, frontman for Fall Out Boy
 April 28 – Ana Cruz Kayne, actress
 April 29
 Taylor Cole, actress
 Marina Squerciati, actress
 April 30
 Seimone Augustus, basketball player
 William Timmons, politician

May

 May 1
 David Backes, ice hockey player
 Kerry Bishé, actress
 Henry Zebrowski, actor and comedian
 May 3
 Tony Barros, basketball player
 Demetress Bell, football player
 Angel Blue, opera singer
 Cheryl Burke, dancer
 Morgan Kibby, actress and singer/songwriter
 May 6
 Abu Mansoor Al-Amriki, American-born Somali terrorist (d. 2013)
 Demarius Bolds, basketball player
 May 7
 Marvelyn Brown, AIDS activist
 Marc Burch, soccer player
 James Loney, baseball player
 Alex Smith, football player
 May 8
 Tracy Belton, football player
 Julia Whelan, actress  
 May 9 
 Prince Fielder, baseball player
 Chase Headley, baseball player
 Ezra Klein, journalist, blogger and columnist
 May 10 – Brent Bommentre, pair ice dancer
 May 11
 Naki Akarobettoe, poet
 Rashad Barksdale, football player
 John Bowie, football player
 Holly Bowling, pianist
 Noah Bryant, shot putter
 May 12
 Amar Bakshi, artist and founder of Shared Studios and Portals
 C. J. Brewer, football player
 May 13
 Kristen Butler, softball player
 Joe Neguse, politician
 May 14
 Jessica Boone, actress
 Mark Zuckerberg, founder and creator of Facebook
 May 15
 Colin Hufman, Olympic curler
 Nick Perri, singer/songwriter and guitarist
 May 16
 Wayne Arnold, basketball player
 Brian Beaman, Olympic sports shooter
 Christopher Steven Brown, music executive
 May 17
 Brittany Anjou, musician, composer, pianist, vibraphonist, and producer
 Jayson Blair, actor
 Alejandro Edda, Mexican-born actor
 May 19
 Rishi Bhat, actor and internet entrepreneur
 Catherine Haena Kim, actress and model
 May 20
 Naturi Naughton, singer and actress
 Kenny Vasoli, singer-songwriter
 May 21
 Parag Agrawal, Indian-born software engineer and CEO of Twitter, Inc.
 Danielle Andersen, poker player
 Sunkrish Bala, Indian-born actor
 Jarrett Bush, football player
 Jackson Pearce, novelist
 Gary Woodland, golfer
 Marnie Schulenburg, actress (d. 2022)
 May 22 – Darren Barnett, football player (d. 2021)
 May 23
 Sam Milby, actor and rock musician
 Adam Wylie, actor
 May 24
 Héctor Ambriz, baseball player
 The Audible Doctor, record producer and rapper
 Sarah Hagan, actress
 May 25 – Shawne Merriman, football player
 May 26 – Josh Bolton, soccer player
 May 27
 Blake Ahearn, basketball player and coach
 Emily Brewer, politician
 Darin Brooks, actor 
 May 29
 Carmelo Anthony, basketball player
 Nia Jax, Australian-born wrestler
 Kaycee Stroh, actress, singer and dancer  
 May 30 – DeWanda Wise, actress
 May 31
 Andrew Bailey, baseball player
 Nate Robinson, basketball player

June

 June 1 – David Neville, Olympic sprinter
 June 2 – Stevie Ryan, YouTube personality, actress and comedian (d. 2017)
 June 4
 Vinay Bhat, chess grandmanster
 Jillian Murray, actress
 June 5 – Simon Rich, comic writer
 June 6
 Curt Anderson, Christian musician and worship leader
 David Ball, football player
 Gene Borrello, mafia criminal
 Jeff Burk, author and editor
 Brandon Scott Jones, actor
 Shannon Stewart, model
 Jason Trusnik, football player
 June 7
 Walt Bell, football player and coach
 Justin Berg, baseball player
 June 8 
 Jared Allman, actor
 Todd Boeckman, football player 
 Torrey DeVitto, actress and fashion model
 June 9
 Kirill Bichutsky, Russian-born photographer, event organizer, and entrepreneur
 Caroline D'Amore, DJ, model and actress  
 June 10
 Grayson Boucher, streetball player, basketball player, and actor
 Betsy Sodaro, actress and voice actress
 June 11 – Vincent Bevins, journalist and writer
 June 12 – Donnie Avery, football player
 June 13 – Phillip Van Dyke, actor
 June 14
 Lorenzo Booker, football player
 Hydeia Broadbent, HIV/AIDS activist
 June 15
 Terry Alvino, soccer player
 Tim Lincecum, baseball player
 June 16
 Jahsha Bluntt, basketball player
 Jonathan Broxton, baseball player
 June 17
 John Gallagher Jr., actor, singer and dancer
 Chris Weidman, mixed martial artist
 June 18
 Angry Joe, YouTuber
 Ian Jones-Quartey, animator and voice actor 
 June 19 – Paul Dano, actor and producer
 June 20 – Hassan Adams, basketball player
 June 21 – Jessica White, model
 June 22
 Allen Barbre, football player
 Patrick B. Burke, politician
 Dustin Johnson, golfer
 Matt Lauria, actor
 June 24
 Lucien Dodge, voice actor
 JJ Redick, basketball player
 June 25
 Aundrae Allison, football player
 Bryan Avila, politician
 Lauren Bush, model and producer, co-founder of FEED Projects, and daughter of George W. Bush
 Natalie Sims, Christian hip hop singer/songwriter
 June 26
 John Bucy III, politician
 Raymond Felton, basketball player
 Aubrey Plaza, actress and comedian
 Deron Williams, basketball player
 Eddie Wineland, mixed martial artist
 June 27
 Khloé Kardashian, television personality
 Conor Lamb, politician
 June 28
 Gerald Alexander, football player and coach
 Eric Friedman, heavy metal musician and songwriter
 June 29 – Kathryn Augustyn, rugby player
 June 30
 Miles Austin, football player and coach
 Fantasia, R&B singer, American Idol'' winner
 Elisa Jordana, American radio and TV personality, musician, writer, online talk-show host, and keytarist for Cobra Starship

July

 July 1 – Jason Reeves, folk singer/songwriter
 July 2
 Aaron Bernstine, politician
 Vanessa Lee Chester, actress
 Elise Stefanik, politician
 Johnny Weir, figure skater, fashion designer and television commentator
 July 3
 DaBryan Blanton, sprinter
 Manny Lawson, football player
 July 4
 Adarsh Alphons, Indian-born entrepreneur, philanthropist, artist, and founder of ProjectArt
 Gina Glocksen, singer
 July 5
 Bill Barnwell, sportswriter
 AJ Gil, singer
 Zack Miller, golfer
 July 7
 Jorge Andres, Peruvian-born sportscaster
 Ross Malinger, actor 
 July 8
 Eric Branscum, screenwriter
 Brendan Burke, sportscaster
 Alexis Dziena, actress
 July 9
 Andrew Breiner, football player and coach
 Hanna R. Hall, actress
 Sarah Lacina, television personality
 July 10
 Aviva Baumann, actress
 Tim Blue, basketball player
 July 11
 Tanith Belbin White, Canadian-born Olympic figure skater
 Joe Pavelski, hockey player
 July 12
 Erica Buettner, indie folk singer/songwriter
 Matt Cook, actor
 Amanda Hocking, novelist
 Natalie Martinez, actress and model
 July 14
 Erica Blasberg, golfer (d. 2010)
 Ashlé Dawson, dancer
 Alex Ross Perry, director, screenwriter, and actor
 July 15 – Noah Bendix-Balgley, violinist
 July 17
 Melissa Bachman, huntress, producer, and host
 Josh Barro, journalist
 Katie Uhlaender, Olympic skeleton racer
 July 18
 Ben Askren, mixed martial artist
 Allen Craig, baseball player
 July 19
 Tyson Burmeister, speedway rider
 Kaitlin Doubleday, actress
 July 21 – Paul Davis, basketball player
 July 22 – Jamilah Lemieux, writer
 July 23
 James Holzhauer, game show champion
 Brandon Roy, basketball player
 Celeste Thorson, actress and model
 July 24
 Tala Ashe, Iranian-born actress
 Desmond Bishop, football player
 Kristen Dowling, basketball coach
 July 26
 Emily Axford, actress, writer, and producer
 Mike Beltran, politician
 Grace Byers, actress
 July 27
 Andrew Anglin, white supremacist
 Antoine Bethea, football player
 Lindsay Burdge, actress and producer
 Taylor Schilling, actress
 July 28 
 DeMeco Ryans, football player
 Ali Krieger, soccer player
 Zach Parise, ice hockey player
 John David Washington, football player, actor and producer
 July 29
 Toby Basner, MLB umpire
 Chad Billingsley, baseball player
 Todd Bosley, actor
 J. Madison Wright Morris, actress (d. 2006)
 July 30 
 Gina Rodriguez, actress and producer
 Gabrielle Christian, actress
 July 31
 Joseph Benavidez, mixed martial artist
 DJ B-Do, rapper and record producer
 Uriah Hall, martial artist

August

 August 1 – Danny Tidwell, dancer (d. 2020)
 August 2
 Brandon Browner, football player
 Britt Nicole, Christian singer/songwriter
 J. D. Vance, political commentator, politician, venture capitalist, and author
 August 3
 Carah Faye Charnow, singer for Shiny Toy Guns
 Jon Foster, actor and musician
 Sarah Lane, ballerina
 Ryan Lochte, Olympic swimmer
 Gabe Vasquez, politician
 August 4
 Vandit Bhatt, actor
 Nick Lazzarini, dancer
 August 5 – Rashaun Broadus, American-born Albanian basketball player
 August 6 – Kelly Williams Brown, writer and author
 August 7 – Omar Espinosa, guitarist
 August 8 – Joe Ayoob, football player
 August 10
 Ryan Eggold, actor
 Ja'Tovia Gary, artist and filmmaker
 August 11 – Melky Cabrera, baseball player
 August 13
 Rory Bosio, trail runner
 Eme Ikwuakor, actor
 August 14
 Brylan Van Artsdalen, mixed martial artist
 Nevin Ashley, baseball player
 Clay Buchholz, baseball player
 August 15
 Quinton Aaron, actor
 Tyson Brummett, baseball player (d. 2020)
 August 16 – Magno, wrestler
 August 17
 Raphael Bob-Waksberg, comedian, writer, producer, actor, and voice actor
 Dee Brown, basketball player
 Martin Brown, boxer
 Garrett Wolfe, football player
 August 18 – Kim Glass, volleyball player and model
 August 19
 Micah Alberti, model and actor
 Jermon Bushrod, football player
 Quinton Lucas, politician, mayor of Kansas City, Missouri
 August 20 – Tom Speer, mixed martial artist
 August 21 – Eve Torres, actress, dancer, model, martial arts instructor, and wrestler
 August 23 – Charles Ali, football player
 August 24
 Blake Berris, actor
 Charlie Villanueva, basketball player
 August 25 – Kelly Bires, stock car racing driver
 August 26
 Andrew Belle, singer/songwriter
 Big Body Bes, rapper and television presenter
 Craig Owens, singer and frontman for Chiodos
 August 27
 Aone Beats, Nigerian-born record producer and songwriter
 Amanda Fuller, actress
 August 28 – Sarah Roemer, actress
 August 29 – Kelly Anundson, mixed martial artist
 August 31 – Ryan Kesler, ice hockey player

September

 September 1 – Joe Trohman, singer-songwriter, composer and guitarist for Fall Out Boy
 September 2
 Tyler Aldridge, golfer
 Drew Jacoby, ballerina
 Charles Trippy; musician, vlogger, Internet personality, and bassist for We the Kings
 Tony Vargas, politician
 September 3
 Garrett Hedlund, actor, model and singer
 T. J. Perkins, wrestler
 September 4 – Kyle Mooney, actor, comedian and writer
 September 5 – Jon Anderson, wrestler
 September 6
 Matt King, artist and co-founder of Meow Wolf (d. 2022)
 Abby Martin, journalist
 September 7
 J. D. Bergman, wrestler
 Kate Miner, actress and musician
 September 9 – Katie Balloons, balloon artist and entertainer
 September 10
 Molly Aguirre, snowboarder
 Darnell Bing, football player
 Andrew Brown, baseball player
 September 12 – Mildon Ambres, basketball player
 September 13
 Nabil Abou-Harb, filmmaker, writer, producer, and director
 Eric Butler, football player
 September 14
 Melik Brown, football player
 Adam Lamberg, actor
 September 15
 Chiara Angelicola, singer/songwriter and musician
 Cyhi the Prynce, rapper and singer/songwriter
 September 16
 Aaron Brant, football player
 Sabrina Bryan, actress and singer
 Stanley Burrell, basketball player
 Ali Fedotowsky, television personality
 September 18
 Nina Arianda, actress
 Cecil Brockman, politician
 Dashon Goldson, football player
 Anthony Gonzalez, football player and politician
 September 19
 Rudy Burgess, football player
 Eva Marie, actress, fashion designer, model, and wrestler
 Young Greatness, rapper (d. 2018)
 Lydia Hearst, actress and fashion model
 September 20 – Holly Weber, actress and model
 September 21
 Dwayne Bowe, football player
 Ben Wildman-Tobriner, Olympic swimmer
 Rashad McCants, basketball player
 Wale, rapper
 September 22
 Brock Berryhill, songwriter, record producer, engineer, and musician
 Richard Bryant, actor
 September 23
 Kate French, actress and model
 Matt Kemp, baseball player
 Anneliese van der Pol, Dutch-born actress and singer
 September 24
 Ryan Ashton, actor, director, and screenwriter
 Esther Baxter, model and actress
 Bobby Brown, basketball player
 September 25
 Devin Aromashodu, football player
 CariDee English, fashion model and TV personality
 Zach Woods, actor and comedian
 September 26
 John Dodson, mixed martial artist
 Yaniv Schulman, television personality, host, and producer
 September 27
 Kirk Archibeque, basketball player
 Andrew Garbarino, politician
 September 28
 Baraka Atkins, football player
 H. B. Blades, football player
 Melody Thornton, singer 
 Ryan Zimmerman, baseball player

October

 October 1 
 Inaki Basauri, Mexican-born rugby player
 Beck Bennett, actor and screenwriter
 Josh Brener, actor
 Matt Cain, baseball player
 October 2
 Courtney Bryan, football player
 Ray Burse, soccer player
 Jena Griswold, politician
 John Morris, actor
 October 3
 Lance Barrett, MLB umpire
 Chris Marquette, actor 
 Ashlee Simpson, singer and actress
 October 5
 Naima Adedapo, singer and dancer
 Odin Biron, American-born Russian actor
 Casey Bond, actor, producer, and basketball player
 Brooke Valentine, urban musician
 Julianna Zobrist, Christian singer/songwriter
 October 6
 Afa Anoa'i Jr., wrestler
 Jonathan Austin, cinematographer
 Reggie Ball, football player
 Ben Barkema, football player
 Austin Channing Brown, writer and public speaker
 Joanna Pacitti, singer
 October 7
 Andy Bean, actor
 Mark Bradford, football player
 October 9 – Heather Baker, producer, guitarist, and musical director
 October 10
 Charlie Beljan, golfer
 Rod Benson, basketball player
 Tiffany Blackmon, sport reporter
 Elana Meyers, Olympic bobsledder
 October 11 – Patrick Baynes, entrepreneur
 October 12
 Lewis Baker, football player
 Lauren Book, politician
 October 14 
 Jason Davis, actor (d. 2020)
 Santino Quaranta, soccer player
 October 15
 Brandon Bowman, basketball player
 Larry Brown, football player
 Bobby Burling, soccer player
 October 16 – Mkristo Bruce, football player
 October 17
 Chris Lowell, actor
 Randall Munroe, programmer and webcomic artist
 Luke Rockhold, mixed martial artist
 October 18
 Xavier Adibi, football player
 Hollie Dunaway, boxer
 Esperanza Spalding, singer
 Lindsey Vonn, Olympic skier
 October 19
 Ramon Alexander, politician
 Antwan Barnes, football player
 Justin Beaver, football player
 Elaine Bradley, drummer for Neon Trees
 Ashleigh Buch, USAF airman and ultimate player
 October 20
 Dan Adams, football player
 Mike Banner, soccer player
 Charles Booker, politician
 Mitch Lucker, heavy metal singer for Suicide Silence (d. 2012)
 October 21
 Tom Brandstater, football player
 Marvin Mitchell, football player
 October 22 – Scott Beck, director, producer, and screenwriter
 October 23
 Jason Butcher, mixed martial artist
 Meghan McCain, author and columnist, daughter of Senator John McCain
 October 24
 George Bussey, football player
 Ben Giroux, actor and director
 Erin Lucas, actress
 October 25 – Katy Perry, singer-songwriter 
 October 26 – Amanda Overmyer, singer 
 October 27
 Will Blackmon, football player
 Kelly Osbourne, English-born television personality and singer
 Brady Quinn, football player
 October 28
 Adil Bhatti, Pakistani-born cricketer
 Finn Wittrock, actor
 October 29
 Chris Baio, bassist for Vampire Weekend
 Keenan Burton, football player
 October 30
 Scott Clifton, actor, musician and television personality
 Eva Marcille, model
 October 31 
 Pat Murray, football player
 Anthony Varvaro, baseball player (d. 2022)

November

 November 4
 Branden Albert, football player
 Dustin Brown, ice hockey player
 Kirk Barton, football player
 November 5 – Nick Folk, football player 
 November 6 – Ricky Romero, baseball player
 November 7
 Jeff Allison, baseball player
 Jonathan Bornstein, American-born Israeli soccer player
 Simon Sherry-Wood, Irish-born television personality and model
 November 9
Beatrice Bofia, Cameroonian-born basketball player
French Montana, Moroccan-born rapper
Joel Zumaya, baseball player
 November 11
 Hilton Armstrong, basketball player
 Bryce Bennett, politician
 Dallas Buck, baseball player
 November 12 
 Jorge Masvidal, mixed martial artist
 Omarion, singer-songwriter and actor
 Benjamin Okolski, figure skater
 November 13
 Melvin Bullitt, football player
 Gary Butler, football player
 Sarah Rose Karr, actress
 November 14 – Tony Gaffney, basketball player
 November 15
 Loren Brichter, software developer
 Asia Kate Dillon, actress
 Xochitl Torres Small, politician
 November 16
 Adam Bagni, journalist and sportscaster
 Kimberly J. Brown, actress
 November 17
 Zach Anner, comedian, actor, and writer
 Lauren Maltby, actress and psychologist
 November 18
 DeAnna Bennett, mixed martial artist
 Zack Bowman, football player
 November 19
 Greg Austin, football player
 Lindsay Ellingson, model
 November 20
 Ezra Butler, football player
 Jeremy Jordan, actor and singer 
 November 21
 Quintin Berry, baseball player
 Josh Boone, basketball player
 Jena Malone, actress, musician and photographer
 November 22
 Josh Barrett, football player
 Scarlett Johansson, actress
 November 23
 BJ the Chicago Kid, singer/songwriter
 Bossman, rapper
 Lucas Grabeel, actor
 Jarah Mariano, model
 November 24
 Anthony Alridge, football player
 Brandon Bair, football player
 David Booth, ice hockey player
 Jeremiah Brent, interior designer and television personality
 November 25 – Ryan Baker, football player
 November 27
 Benny the Butcher, rapper and actor
 Rodney Burgess, football player
 November 28
 Joshua Alan, singer/songwriter and musician
 Alan Ritchson, actor, model and singer
 Trey Songz, singer/songwriter, rapper, record producer and actor
 Mary Elizabeth Winstead, actress
 November 30 – Tom Almadon, American-born Israeli footballer

December

 December 1
 Ali Almossawi, Bahraini-born author
 Darren Brazil, editor, producer, and videographer
 Charles Michael Davis, actor, model, producer, and director
 December 2 – Eric Bakhtiari, football player
 December 3 – Mike Affleck, football player
 December 4
 Ikaika Alama-Francis, football player
 Lindsay Felton, actress
 Jelly Roll, country rapper and singer
 Brooke Tessmacher, model and wrestler
 December 5 – Lauren London, actress and model
 December 6 – Whitney Bond, television personality, food blogger, social media consultant, and cookbook author
 December 7 – Mike Baxter, baseball player
 December 8
 Vince Anderson, football player
 Sam Hunt, country singer/songwriter
 December 10
 Brian Boner, politician
 JTG, wrestler
 Billy Rymer, drummer for The Dillinger Escape Plan
 December 11
 Josh Butler, baseball player
 Xosha Roquemore, actress
 December 12
 Rivington Bruce Bisland III, esports commentator
 Court McGee, mixed martial artist
 December 14
 Mike Fuentes, drummer, co-founder of Pierce the Veil
 Jackson Rathbone, actor and singer
 December 15 – Max Green, singer, bassist for Escape the Fate (2002-2012), and frontman for Violent New Breed
 December 17
 Bobby East, stock car racing driver (d. 2022)
 Mikky Ekko, singer
 Tennessee Thomas, British-born drummer and actor
 Shannon Woodward, actress
 December 18 – Brian Boyle, ice hockey player
 December 20
 Brian Abraham, baseball coach and executive
 Kevin Byrne, politician
 December 21 – Sammi Brown, politician
 December 22
 Brian Butch, basketball player
 Greg Finley, actor
 December 23
 Alison Sudol, singer-songwriter and actress (aka A Fine Frenzy)
 Cary Williams, football player
 December 24 – Pat Buck, wrestler
 December 25 – Chris Richard, basketball player
 December 26 – Jenny Shakeshaft, actress and model
 December 27
 Desiree Akhavan, director, producer, screenwriter, and actress
 Amanda Bouldin, politician
 Tye'sha Fluker, basketball player
 December 28
 Matt Bessette, mixed martial artist
 Barret Browning, baseball player
 December 29
 38 Spesh, rapper and producer
 Alan Branch, football player
 December 30 – LeBron James, basketball player

Full Date Unknown

 Nick Adams, Australian-born conservative political commentator and author
 Syed Haris Ahmed, Pakistani-born terrorist
 Maneet Ahuja, author, journalist, television news producer, and hedge fund specialist
 Hyder Akbar, Pakistani-born Afghan-American writer and entrepreneur
 Roozbeh Aliabadi, Iranian-born advisor and commentator on geopolitical risk and geoeconomics
 Kai Altair, singer/songwriter
 Karim Amer, producer and director
 Chino Amobi, experimental electronic musician, contemporary artist, and director
 Olga Balema, Ukrainian-born artist and sculptor
 Sarah Ballard, University professor
 Bobby Barbier, baseball coach
 Sadie Barnette, artist
 Abigail Barrows, marine research scientist
 Chloë Bass, artist
 Jessie Baylin, singer/songwriter
 Adam Becker, astrophysicist, author, and scientific philosopher
 Josh Begley, digital artist
 Kenan Bell, hip hop artist and teacher
 Genevieve Belleveau, artist
 Robert Jackson Bennett, writer
 Shawn Bentler, convicted mass murderer
 Marcos Berríos, astronaut for NASA
 Diana Campbell Betancourt, curator
 Eric Biddines, rapper, vocalist, and record producer
 Sarah Blake, poet
 Aluel James Bol, Sudanese-born pilot
 Cristine Brache, artist, filmmaker, and writer
 Rinat Brodach, Israeli-born fashion designer
 Stephanie Bruce, long-distance runner
 Robert Burke, screenwriter, producer, and director
 Nia Burks, artist
 Benjamin A. Burtt, sound editor
 Jake Chapman, politician

Deaths

 January 14 – Ray Kroc, businessman and founder of McDonald's (b. 1902)
 January 20 – Johnny Weissmuller, Austro-Hungarian-born American swimmer and actor (b. 1904)
 February 15 – Avon Long, actor and singer (b. 1910)
 February 22 – David Vetter, plastic bubble patient (b. 1971) 
 February 24 – Tyrone Mitchell, murderer (suicide) (b. 1955)
 March 18
 Charley Lau, baseball player (b. 1933)
 Paul Francis Webster, lyricist (b. 1907)
 March 20 – Stan Coveleski, baseball player and member of the MLB Hall of Fame (b. 1889)
 March 23 – Shauna Grant, porn actress (b. 1963)
 March 28
 Ben Washam, animator (b. 1915)
 Benjamin Mays, Baptist minister and civil rights leader (b. 1894)
 April 1 – Marvin Gaye, singer-songwriter and musician (b. 1939)
 April 14 – Anders Haugen, ski jumper (b. 1888)
 April 26 – Count Basie, pianist, organist, bandleader and composer (b. 1904)
 May 19 – Michael Silka, spree killer (b. 1958)
 June 30 – Lillian Hellman, playwright (born 1905)
 July 27 – C. L. Franklin, Baptist minister and civil rights activist (b. 1915)
 August 25 – Truman Capote, writer (b. 1924)
 August 26 – Julie Stevens, actress (b. 1916)
 September 24 – Neil Hamilton, actor (b. 1899)
 September 28 – Roy Sullivan, park ranger, world record holder for lightning strikes survived (b. 1912)
 October 1 – Billy Goodman, baseball player (b. 1926)
 December – J. Roderick MacArthur, businessman and philanthropist (b. 1920)

See also 
 1984 in American television
 List of American films of 1984
 Timeline of United States history (1970–1989)

References

External links
 

 
1980s in the United States
United States
United States
Years of the 20th century in the United States